Raymond Edward Perrault (April 14, 1949 – March 5, 2012) was the President and C.E.O. of Research Tool & Die Works, Inc. Married to Karen Denise Gerke, and father to Tami Marie Perrault (F) and Kevin Michael Perrault (M).

Early years 
Raymond Edward Perrault - known to most as Ray - was born in Los Angeles, California to Edna Rose and Frederick Perrault on April 14, 1949. He was the only child for Edna and Fred. He grew up on 97th and Figueroa in what is now called Watts, directly across the street from his elementary school. At an early age Perrault learned the ropes working beside his father, Frederick Perrault, at the family business  Research Tool andDie Works, Inc.

Personal life 
Perrault was married on June 26, 1971 to Karen Denise Gerke. Three years after the marriage Tami Marie was born (January 24, 1975). Then  years later Kevin Michael (May 5, 1978) was born.

Professional life 
Ray graduated from San Diego State in 1970 with a B.A. in Business Administration. While there he served as the local president of S.A.M., the Society for the Advancement of Management. In 1970 after graduation from college, Ray came back around to his father’s business, Research Tool & Die Works, Inc. He started as a production manager and ended up president of the corporation. At the same time he grew the firm from 25 employees and under 1 million in sales, to 55 employees and 8 million in current sales per year. He realized the company needed to expand and in 1979 he moved the firm from Gardena to Carson, from a Quonset hut to a new concrete tilt up building. He further developed the company from 25,000 square feet to the current building size of over 55,000 square feet.

Although Perrault never received formal engineering training he has been granted over a dozen patents  and is credited with creation of the marine electrical hardware industry in the United States. Some of his many patents include the first weld-less twist on hanger. A threaded cable hanger attached to a stud includes a reverse (protuberant) dimple that provides a seat for the end of the stud, and permits the bar to make up to a full final turn to permit the bar to be in a desired orientation. This allowed the cable to be attached firmly while maintaining the correct orientation.

Perrault also had a role in developing the MIL Spec Standards used in building Naval Ships in the United States. As with the creation and patent of the compact wireway arrangement for ships, among others, the Navy amended the Electric Plant Installation Standard Methonds to includes his arrangement.

References

1949 births
2012 deaths
American businesspeople
20th-century American inventors
People from Rolling Hills, California